Articles related to Saskatchewan include:

A 
Aboriginal peoples in Saskatchewan
[+] Aboriginal peoples in Saskatchewan categories
Aboriginal People's Party
Agriculture in Saskatchewan
Airports - list
[+] Airports
[+] Airports - Defunct

B 
Bay Trail, Saskatchewan
Bible Belt
Blackfoot
Large blizzard sweeps through British Columbia, Northern Alberta and Saskatchewan - January 10, 2007 Wikinews Exclusives Original reporting
Block Settlement
[+] Bridges in Saskatchewan
[+] Buildings and Structures

C 
[+] Canada-related lists
Canadian Companies
Canadian Prairies
[+] Canadian projects
Census Divisions
[+] Cities
Climate change in Saskatchewan
Coat of Arms of Saskatchewan
[+] Colleges
Commemorative Medal for the Centennial of Saskatchewan
Communist Party of Canada (Saskatchewan)
Communities - towns, cities, villages
[+] Companies based in Saskatchewan
[+] Companies of Canada
Constitution Act, 1930 (annotated)/Schedule (3) - Wikisource
Cooperative Commonwealth Federation
Corner Gas Canadian situation comedy of Dog River Saskatchewan AKA
Corner Gas - Wikiquote
Corner Gas -Wikinews
Court of Appeal
[+] Crown corporations of Saskatchewan
[+] Culture
[+] Curlers from Saskatchewan
Curling - provincial sport

D 
District of Saskatchewan - pre 1905
Districts of the Northwest Territories - pre 1905
[+] Districts of the Northwest Territories categories - pre 1905
Dominion Land Survey

E 
Education in Canada
[+] Education
Economic Group
Elections, general - FEATURE list status [+] Elections, Categories
[+] electoral districts
Executive Council of Saskatchewan
Extreme communities of Canada

 F 
Father of medicare
[+] federal electoral districts
[+] federal electoral districts - defunct
[+] First Nations governments in Saskatchewan
[+] First Nations in Saskatchewan
Flag of Saskatchewan
[+] Flora of Saskatchewan
Fransaskois

 G 
Gabriel Dumont Institute
[+] Geography
[+] Geographical short articles
[+] Ghost towns in Saskatchewan

 H 
[+] High schools in Saskatchewan
Highways -- List
[+] Highways -Categories
[+] History
History of Courts
History of immigration to Canada
History of Northwest Territories capital cities - pre 1905
[+] Hospitals in Saskatchewan

 I 
Ice Hockey teams
Indian reserves in Saskatchewan
[+] Indigenous peoples of the Americas

 J 
[+] Junior Hockey League players
[+] Junior Hockey League teams
[+] Junior Hockey League teams - Defunct

 K 

 L 
[+] Lakes of Saskatchewan
[+] Law
[+] Law Enforcement
Leader of the Opposition (Saskatchewan)
Legislative Assembly of Saskatchewan
Lieutenant Governor of Saskatchewan
[+] Lieutenant Governors of Saskatchewan

 M 
[+] Mayors of places in Saskatchewan
[+] Mayors of Moose Jaw - category
Mayors of Moose Jaw, Saskatchewan - list
mayors of Regina, Saskatchewan
[+] Media
[+] Members of the Canadian House of Commons from Saskatchewan
MLA's
Monarchy in Saskatchewan
[+] Museums
Music of Saskatchewan
[+] musicians

 N 
National Parks
Natural History
New Green Alliance
NDP/CCF Member articles
[+] Newspapers published in Saskatchewan
North-West Rebellion
Northwest Territories - Early pre 1905 history

 O 
[+] Organizations

 P 
[+] Parks in Saskatchewan
[+] People
[+] People from Regina
[+] Photographs Requested
[+] Politicians
Political parties
[+] Politics
Postal Codes for Saskatchewan
[+] Pre-Confederation Saskatchewan people
Premier of Saskatchewan
Premiers of Saskatchewan -list
[+] Premiers
Progressive Conservative Party of Saskatchewan
[+] provincial electoral districts
[+] Provincial electoral districts - historical
Provincial parks
[+] Provincial political parties in Saskatchewan
provincial and territorial symbols
Provincial Rights Party
[+] Provinces and Territories of Canada categories
Provinces and territories of Canada
Provincial Court

 Q 
Queen's Bench

 R 
[+] Radio stations in Saskatchewan - category
Radio stations in Saskatchewan - list
[+] Railways of Saskatchewan
[+] Regina - Capital City
Regions of Saskatchewan - list
Regions of Canada, Saskatchewan - list
[+] Restaurants in Saskatchewan
Rivers - List
[+] Rivers
Roads - project
Roads - list
Roddy Piper - Wikiquote
Rupert's Land - Pre 1868 / 1870
Rupert's Land and North-Western Territory Order - Wikisource
Rural Municipalities - list
[+] Rural Municipalities

 S 
Same-sex marriage in SaskatchewanSaskatchewanSaskatchewan Act, The
Saskatchewan Act from Wikisource
Saskatchewan Archaeological Society
Saskatchewan Archives Board[+] Saskatchewan - Articles which are stubs[+] Saskatchewan - Articles finished or categories'''
Saskatchewan category of pictures
Saskatchewan - Commons pictures
Saskatchewan Dragoons
Saskatchewan Filmpool Cooperative
[+] Saskatchewan law
Saskatchewan from The New Student's Reference Work - Wikisource
Saskatchewan History - the magazine
Saskatchewan Film and Video Classification Board
Saskatchewan Liberal Party
Saskatchewan New Democrats
Saskatchewan Order of Merit
Saskatchewan Party
[+] Saskatchewan Roughriders
[+] Wikipedians interested in Saskatchewan Roughriders
[+] Saskatchewan Roughriders players
Saskatchewan Youth Parliament
[+] School districts in Saskatchewan
School Divisions
[+] Schools in Saskatchewan
[+] Schools - elementary -  in Saskatchewan
Scouting in Saskatchewan
[+] Senators from Saskatchewan - category
Senators from Saskatchewan - list
[+] Shopping malls in Saskatchewan
Social Credit Party of Saskatchewan
[+] Sport
[+] Sports people
[+] Sports teams
[+] Sports venues in Saskatchewan

T 
The Saskatchewan Act
Television stations in Saskatchewan - category
Television stations in Saskatchewan - list
Territorial evolution of Canada
Time in Saskatchewan
Tommy Douglas - Wikiquote
[+] Transport in Saskatchewan
[+] Trees of Saskatchewan

U 
Umeå - sister city
Unionest Party
United Reform
University of Saskatchewan
[+] University of Saskatchewan
[+] University of Saskatchewan alumni
[+] University of Saskatchewan faculty
[+] University of Saskatchewan Presidents 
[+] Universities
[+] Uranium mines

V

W 
Wanuskewin Heritage Park
Western Canada Concept Party of Saskatchewan
Western Independence Party of Saskatchewan
[+] Wikipedians in Saskatchewan

X

Y

Z

See also

Index of Canada-related articles

Saskatchewan